Carúpano is a Venezuelan rum which is being produced by Carupano Distillery founded in 1762 in Macarapana-Carúpano, Venezuela.

The Distillery 
Destilería Carúpano’s historic tradition dates back to 1762 when the Hacienda Altamira-Carúpano in Macarapana is established by the Spanish captain Felix del Fierro, and that is where, for the first time in Venezuela, what is now called Ron Añejo was produced. In 1954 the Morrison family bought the bicentenary Hacienda Altamira, abandoned since 1901, after the death of Thomas Massiani, one of the owners. The original intent of the new owners, taking into account the water wealth of the estate and its tradition of producing rums, was to re-establish its sugarcane milling capacity and the distillation and aging of rums; for this purpose, they join forces with Alejandro Hernandez, owner of Industrias Pampero, and sharing equal ownership, create Destilería Carúpano, CA, a relationship that lasted until 1962.

Aged Rums 
The distillery is well known for its selection of aged rums or otherwise known as Ron Añejo Carúpano Legendario,
some may reach up to 80 years of aging and retail for up to $1000 US dollars. 
Current selection of aged rums:
 Ron Añejo Carúpano Legendario
 Ron Añejo Carúpano XO 
 Ron Añejo Carúpano Solera Centenaria  
 Ron Añejo Carúpano Oro  
 Ron Añejo Carúpano

References

External links
 Distillery Carupano webpage

Rums
Venezuelan brands